Patrik Šimko (born 8 July 1991) is a Slovak professional footballer who plays for the Czech 1. Liga club 1. FC Slovacko. He made his debut in Slovak 1. Liga for MŠK Žilina against MFK Košice on 2 October 2010.

External links

References

1991 births
Living people
Slovak footballers
Association football defenders
1. FC Tatran Prešov players
MŠK Žilina players
1. HFK Olomouc players
Slovak Super Liga players
Expatriate footballers in the Czech Republic